Winston Churchill: The Wilderness Years is an eight-part 1981 drama serial based on Winston Churchill's years in enforced exile from political position during the 1920s and 1930s. It was made by Southern Television on a budget of £3¼ million and originally broadcast on ITV on Sunday nights at 10 pm. It was written and directed by Ferdinand Fairfax, with historian Martin Gilbert as co-writer. Churchill was played by Robert Hardy, who earned a BAFTA nomination for Best Actor and went on to play him in several other productions.

Plot summary
The series focuses on the decade from 1929 to 1939 during which Winston Churchill was out of power and out of favour. During that time he attempted to make his colleagues and countrymen aware of Nazi Germany's  threat to Britain. He comes up against much resistance from fellow politicians Stanley Baldwin, Samuel Hoare and the appeasement policies of Neville Chamberlain. He faces problems not only in politics but at home as well.

Episodes

Cast

Robert Hardy as Winston Churchill
Siân Phillips as Clementine Churchill
Nigel Havers as Randolph Churchill
Tim Pigott-Smith as Brendan Bracken
David Swift as Professor Lindemann
Sherrie Hewson as Mrs. Pearman
Moray Watson as Major Desmond Morton
Paul Freeman as Ralph Wigram
Frank Middlemass as Lord Derby
Sam Wanamaker as Bernard Baruch
Peter Barkworth as Stanley Baldwin
Eric Porter as Neville Chamberlain
Edward Woodward as Sir Samuel Hoare
Peter Vaughan as Sir Thomas Inskip
Robert James as Ramsay MacDonald
Tony Mathews as Anthony Eden
Ian Collier as Harold Macmillan
Marcella Markham as Nancy Astor
Walter Gotell as Lord Swinton
Richard Murdoch as Lord Halifax
Clive Swift as Sir Horace Wilson
Phil Brown as Lord Beaverbrook
Diane Fletcher as Ava Wigram
Geoffrey Toone as Sir Louis Kershaw
Norman Jones as Clement Attlee
Geoffrey Chater as Lord Hailsham
Stratford Johns as Lord Rothermere
Norman Bird as Sir Maurice Hankey
Roger Bizley as Ernst Hanfstaengl
James Cossins as Lord Lothian
Guy Deghy as King George V
Stephen Elliott as William Randolph Hearst
Günter Meisner as Adolf Hitler
Frederick Jaeger as Joachim von Ribbentrop
David Langton as Lord Londonderry
Preston Lockwood as Austen Chamberlain
David Markham as the Duke of Marlborough
Richard Marner as Ewald von Kleist-Schmenzin
Llewellyn Rees as Lord Salisbury
Terence Rigby as Thomas Barlow
Margaret Courtenay as Maxine Elliott
Merrie Lynn Ross as Marion Davies
Nigel Stock as Admiral Domvile

Reception
Writing for The New York Times, Walter Goodman noted Hardy "gives a remarkable impersonation of Churchill", but wrote "Unfortunately, the impersonation does not quite rise to full characterization; at moments the mannerisms bury the human being beneath them." He summarized: "... drama-heightening liberties are the indispensable grease to this kind of vehicle; eight hours of speeches about the national peril and the shortage of aircraft could prove wearing even to Churchill buffs. Events and personalities are strained and strained again through the historian, the dramatist, the director, the actors. If the result works as well as it does here, if it does not distort events out of recognizable shape, if it brings the dead to a semblance of life, that is an accomplishment."

People magazine panned the series premiere as "an aimless and excruciatingly dull premiere of an eight-part miniseries... the production remains mired in a dramatic desert."

However, in 2016 Mark Lawson was far more favourable in The Guardian, ranking Hardy's portrayal as the second most memorable television representation of Churchill, beaten only by Albert Finney in The Gathering Storm. Lawson wrote: "With an acting style that tends towards the large, loud and posh, Hardy was destined to be one of those actors who seems to have spent almost as much of his life being Churchill as the man himself did. Among Hardy's armful of portrayals, this TV drama musically explores the politician's unusual rhetorical range from whisper to shout." An even more positive appraisal soon followed from Churchill biographer Andrew Roberts in The Spectator, who described Hardy's performance as "still the best depiction of Churchill on a screen." Hardy's intensive research into Churchill, Roberts concluded, "helped make the series the success it was, and set the standard for everything that followed."

It is said that while filming took place, Robert Hardy was so immersed portraying Churchill that, out of habit, he continued showing Churchillian gestures and mannerisms after work on the series had ended.

Awards

Hardy's performance as Churchill won a BAFTA nomination in 1982. Eric Porter as Neville Chamberlain also received praise. The series was nominated for a total of 8 BAFTA awards, namely:
	 
Best Actor (Robert Hardy)
Best Costume Design (Evangeline Harrison)
Best Design (Roger Murray-Leach)
Best Drama Series (Richard Broke/Ferdinand Fairfax)
Best Film Cameraman (Norman G. Langley)
Best Film Editor (Lesley Walker)
Best Make Up (Christine Beveridge/Mary Hillman)
Best Original Television Music (Carl Davis)

Reprises
Hardy also portrayed Churchill in The Sittaford Mystery, Bomber Harris and War and Remembrance. At the 50th anniversary celebrations of the end of World War II in 1995, he quoted a number of Churchill's wartime speeches in character.

References

External links

1980s British drama television series
Films about Winston Churchill
Television series set in the 1920s
Television series set in the 1930s
ITV television dramas
1981 British television series debuts
1981 British television series endings
Television shows produced by Southern Television
English-language television shows
Cultural depictions of Winston Churchill
Cultural depictions of George V
Cultural depictions of Neville Chamberlain
Cultural depictions of Stanley Baldwin
Cultural depictions of Adolf Hitler
Cultural depictions of William Randolph Hearst
Films directed by Ferdinand Fairfax